Vitaliy Semyonovich Dovgun (born February 15, 1971) is a Kazakhstani sport shooter. At age thirty-eight, Dovgun made his official debut for the 2008 Summer Olympics in Beijing, where he competed in all three rifle shooting events. He is also the husband of four-time Olympian Olga Dovgun, who qualified for the same category at these Olympic games.

In his first event, 10 m air rifle, Dovgun was able to hit a total of 587 points within six attempts, finishing thirty-eighth in the qualifying rounds. Few days later, he placed twentieth in the 50 m rifle prone, by one target ahead of Slovenia's Rajmond Debevec from the second attempt, with a total score of 592 points. In his third and last event, 50 m rifle 3 positions, Yurkov was able to shoot 398 targets in a prone position, 381 in standing, and 379 in kneeling, for a total score of 1,158 points, finishing only in twenty-seventh place.

References

External links
NBC 2008 Olympics profile

Kazakhstani male sport shooters
Living people
Olympic shooters of Kazakhstan
Shooters at the 2008 Summer Olympics
1971 births
Asian Games medalists in shooting
Shooters at the 1998 Asian Games
Shooters at the 2002 Asian Games
Shooters at the 2006 Asian Games
Shooters at the 2010 Asian Games
Asian Games gold medalists for Kazakhstan
Asian Games silver medalists for Kazakhstan
Asian Games bronze medalists for Kazakhstan
Medalists at the 2002 Asian Games
Medalists at the 2006 Asian Games
Medalists at the 2010 Asian Games